The Battle of Thermopylae in 254 was the successful defense of the pass of Thermopylae by local Greek militia under Marianus, the Roman proconsul of Achaea, during an invasion of the Balkans by the Goths.

Background
In 254 the Goths invaded and plundered Thrace and Macedonia. In 1979, Herwig Wolfram regarded 254 as the date, while Mallan and Davenport in 2015 suggested 262. Goltz and Hartmann estimated 254 as the date. David Potter in 2016 rejected Mallan and Davenport's estimate and dated it to either 253 or 259. The Goths attempted to storm Thessalonica with close order formations and assault columns. The Thessalonicans mobilized to defend their city and beat off the attacks. The Goths abandoned the siege and moved off to invade Greece south of Thermopylae, seeking to loot the gold and silver wealth of Greek temples.

Prelude
The Greeks learned of the Goths' approach and the Roman proconsul Marianus, the Athenian Philostratus, and the Boeotian Dexippus mobilized a militia to block the pass of Thermopylae. The militia were armed with bronze or iron-tipped wooden pikes, small spears, axes, and assorted weapons. They set to work fortifying the pass. Marianus gave a pre-battle speech to them, emphasizing the defense of the pass by previous generations of Greeks and Romans.

Battle
The Graeco-Roman forces successfully blocked the Goths' way at Thermopylae and the Goths returned home, albeit with considerable loot.

Aftermath
The engagement was recorded by the contemporary historian Dexippus. A fragment of his work, discovered in Vienna in 2010, provides detail on the weapons, leadership, and geography of the engagement. The fragment cuts off before the battle's outcome. Dexippus was used as a source by the Byzantine chronicler George Syncellus, who mentioned the blocking of the pass and the Goths' return home with plunder.

Citations

Bibliography

Further reading
Martin, Gunther; Grusková, Jana (2014) "'Dexippus Vindobonensis' (?) Ein neues Handschriftenfragment zum sog. Herulereinfall der Jahre 267/268" 
"The Vienna Dexippus (?) (second revised version)", uploaded by Jones, Christopher

Thermopylae 254
Crisis of the Third Century
Thermopylae
Thermopylae
Military history of Greece
Thermopylae 254
History of Phthiotis
250s in the Roman Empire